was the 7th Chief Justice of Japan (1976–1977) and a recipient of the Order of the Rising Sun.

He was born in Kyoto Prefecture and graduated from the University of Tokyo in 1931. Early in his career, he worked as a corporate attorney; he was the first practicing attorney to become Chief Justice of Japan. He returned to law practice in 1977 following his resignation.

Fujibayashi was a non-denominational Christian and followed the non-church movement.

Bibliography
 交詢社 第69版 『日本紳士録』 1986年
 山本祐司『最高裁物語』（日本評論社、1994）講談社+α文庫、1997）

External links
 京都新聞/丹波発ふるさとの君たちへ

1907 births
2007 deaths
Chief justices of Japan
Grand Cordons of the Order of the Rising Sun
University of Tokyo alumni
People from Kyoto Prefecture
20th-century Japanese judges